The Xiangtangshan Caves is a group of Buddhist cave temples located in the Fengfeng Mining District about 20 km southwest of the City of Handan, in Hebei province, China. The oldest cave temples in the group date to the Northern Qi, one of the Northern dynasties in the sixth century, and were sponsored by the dynasty's court. The caves are located about 20 km to the northwest of the site of Ye, the capital of the Northern Qi and were carved into dense limestone cliffs on mountains that are part of the Taihang Mountains.

Description and background
There are a total of 36 caves, clustered in three groups: a northern group on Mount Gu near the village of Hecun; a southern group on Mount Fu; and a site at Shuiyusi that is also known as "Little Xiangtangshan". The northern group contains three main caves, the northern cave (cave 7), the central cave (cave 4), and the southern cave (cave 2). According to one historical source, writings by the monk Min Fen, the northern cave group was commissioned by Wen Xuan, the first Northern Qi emperor. The largest cave in the group (the northern cave or cave 7) may have served as the emperor's burial site. Construction of the caves in the southern group started at the initiative of a monk, Hui Yi of the Linghua temple, in 565.  The project was continued under the sponsorship of Gao Anahong, the king of Huai Ying and one of the highest official in the Northern Qi dynasty. Work on the southern caves likely ended around the time when the Northern Qi was annexed by the Northern Zhou in 577. Since they were not sponsored by imperial patrons, the caves in the southern group tend to be smaller than those in the northern group.

Many of the sculpture pieces from the sites were removed and sold internationally as early as 1909. A number were sold to the American collector Charles Freer by the art dealer C.T. Loo, who is suspected of arranging for their removal from China without permission. Many are now in the Freer Gallery in Washington, D.C. (Chinese regulations and Western museum practices now promote protection of such cultural treasures)  The caves are a Major Historical and Cultural Site Protected at the National Level (designation 1-40).

Notes

External links
A Journey to Xiangtangshan  Freer-Sackler Museum website, with images and descriptions of each cave.
 Xiangtangshan Caves Project University of Chicago.

Major National Historical and Cultural Sites in Hebei
Northern Qi
Chinese Buddhist grottoes
Buddhist temples in Handan